Thomas Alonzo Clark (December 20, 1920 – September 4, 2005) was a United States circuit judge of the United States Court of Appeals for the Fifth Circuit and later the United States Court of Appeals for the Eleventh Circuit.

Education and career

Born on December 20, 1920 in Atlanta, Georgia, Clark received a Bachelor of Science degree from Washington and Lee University in 1942 and was in the United States Naval Reserve during World War II, from 1942 to 1946. He received a Bachelor of Laws from the University of Georgia School of Law in 1949, and was in private practice in Bainbridge, Georgia from 1949 to 1955, in Americus, Georgia from 1955 to 1957, and in Tampa, Florida from 1957 to 1979. He was also an instructor at Georgia Southwestern College from 1956 to 1957.

Federal judicial service

On August 28, 1979, Clark was nominated by President Jimmy Carter to a new seat on the United States Court of Appeals for the Fifth Circuit created by 92 Stat. 1629. He was confirmed by the United States Senate on October 31, 1979, and received his commission on November 2, 1979. On October 1, 1981, Clark was reassigned by operation of law to the United States Court of Appeals for the Eleventh Circuit. He assumed senior status on August 31, 1991, serving in that capacity until his death on September 4, 2005, in Vero Beach, Florida, from complications of Alzheimer's disease.

References

Sources
 

1920 births
2005 deaths
People from Atlanta
People from Americus, Georgia
People from Bainbridge, Georgia
Washington and Lee University alumni
United States Navy personnel of World War II
University of Georgia School of Law alumni
Georgia Southwestern State University faculty
Judges of the United States Court of Appeals for the Fifth Circuit
Judges of the United States Court of Appeals for the Eleventh Circuit
United States court of appeals judges appointed by Jimmy Carter
20th-century American judges
United States Navy reservists
Military personnel from Georgia (U.S. state)